Sergey Nikolayevich Mishin (born 11 August 1958, Kaluga, USSR ) is a Soviet and Russian sportsmen, the first in the USSR honored master of sport of Kettlebell lifting.

Biography 
Born into a working-class family. He lives in the city of Kaluga. Sport became engaged in 25 years.

At the professional level, he played from 1983 to 2006, from 2005 to 2008   head coach of Russian national teams.

Achievements
20 —  time champion of Russia
10 —  time World Champion
Champion X Summer Games of the Soviet peoples (1991)

Awards
 Order For Merit to the Fatherland  2nd class

References

External links 
 Biography 
 7 interesting facts about weightlifting
 Sergey Mishin  is the Legend of the World of kettlebell sport

1958 births
Sportspeople from Kaluga
Recipients of the Order "For Merit to the Fatherland", 2nd class
Russian male weightlifters
Living people